Dendrelaphis biloreatus (often called Gore's bronzeback or referred to as the Himalayan bronzeback) is a species of tree snake in the family Colubridae. The species is endemic to Asia.

Geographic range
D. biloreatus can be found in parts of Northeast India (Darjeeling, Assam, and Arunachal Pradesh), northern Myanmar, and Western China (Tibet); it is also reported from Vietnam.

Description
D. biloreatus is highly variable, typically non-venomous (some have enlarged rear fangs and toxic saliva) with large, regular scales on the head.

Taxonomy
Dendrelaphis biloreatus was originally described by Wall in 1910 as Dendrophis gorei, a species new to science. Wall had already described in 1908 another new species, Dendrelaphis biloreatus.  In 1943 M.A. Smith determined that Dendrophis gorei and Dendrelaphis biloreatus are the same species, which he placed in the genus Ahaetulla, as Ahaetulla biloreatus. Since then, this species has been referred to as both Dendrelaphis gorei and Dendrelaphis biloreatus. By precedence Dendrelaphis biloreatus is the correct scientific name, and Dendrelaphis gorei is a junior synonym.

References

Further reading
Smith MA (1943). The Fauna of British India, Ceylon and Burma, Containing the Whole of the Indo-Chinese Sub-region. Reptilia and Amphibia. Vol. III.—Serpentes. London: Secretary of State for India. (Taylor and Francis, printers). xii + 583 pp. (Ahætulla biloreatus, new combination, p. 246).

gorei
Snakes of Asia
Snakes of China
Reptiles of India
Reptiles of Myanmar
Fauna of Tibet
Snakes of Vietnam
Reptiles described in 1908
Taxa named by Frank Wall
Taxobox binomials not recognized by IUCN